Doctor Giorgia is an Italian television series.

Cast

Barbara d'Urso: Dr. Giorgia "Giò" Basile
Fabio Testi: Armando Colucci 
Flavio Bucci: Dr. Nicotera 
Riccardo Cucciolla: Dr. Lombardi
Filippo Nigro: Paolo
Paolo Calissano: Dr. Gianmaria Stefani
Anna Rilke: Daniela
Zoe Incrocci: Giacinta (season 1)

Episodes

See also
List of Italian television series

External links
 

Italian medical television series
1997 Italian television series debuts
1998 Italian television series endings
Rete 4 original programming